Jayne Hughes is the High Bailiff of the Isle of Man (the senior stipendiary magistrate). She was appointed in 2011 as Deputy High Bailiff and in 2019 as High Bailiff. She is the first woman to hold a full-time position in the Manx Judiciary. Prior to being appointed Deputy High Bailiff she worked for the Attorney General's Chambers of the Isle of Man as a Prosecuting Advocate.

References

Living people
Manx people
Year of birth missing (living people)